The following highways are numbered 624:

Costa Rica
 National Route 624

United States
  Pennsylvania Route 624